New Jersey Youth Theatre (NJYT) was a 501(c)3 charitable organization with a business office in Westfield, NJ and Performing Arts School in Roselle Park, NJ. Founded in 1991 by Cynthia Meryl and Theodore J. “Ted” Agress, New Jersey Youth Theatre produced more than 36 main-stage productions. The company closed its doors in 2018 with the founders’ retirement.

History 
NJYT was founded in 1991 by husband and wife duo Theodore J. Agress and Cynthia Meryl - both veterans of stage and television, as Westfield Young Artists Cooperative Theatre (WYACT).  In 2006, the company changed its name to New Jersey Youth Theatre to more accurately reflect the geographical area it serves.

The theatre organization has performed::

References

External links 
 Interview with Cynthia Meryl and Jack Bender on Midnight Madness
 New Jersey Network news story on New Jersey Youth Theatre

Union County, New Jersey
Youth theatre companies